William Richard Cox (August 29, 1919 – March 30, 1978) was an American professional baseball third baseman and shortstop. He played in Major League Baseball (MLB) for the Pittsburgh Pirates, Brooklyn Dodgers, and Baltimore Orioles.

He played for the Newport Buffaloes high school team.  Signed as an amateur free agent by the Pittsburgh Pirates in 1940, Cox made his MLB debut with the Pirates on September 20, 1941, playing in ten games at shortstop that season before serving in the military during World War II.

After returning to the Pirates, he was the starting shortstop in 1946 and 1947 before being traded to the Brooklyn Dodgers on December 8, 1947, along with Preacher Roe and Gene Mauch, for Dixie Walker, Hal Gregg and Vic Lombardi.

Cox was the third baseman of a Dodgers infield in the 1950s that included Gil Hodges, Jackie Robinson and Pee Wee Reese.

In the 1953 World Series, Cox had a two-run double in Game 2 and a three-run homer in Game 5 against the New York Yankees. He batted .304 for the Series and led Brooklyn in runs batted in with six.

Cox was acquired along with Preacher Roe by the Baltimore Orioles from the Dodgers on December 14, 1954 for a pair of minor-leaguers, infielder Harry Schwegman and right-handed pitcher John Jancse, and $60,000. He was an infield starter (principally at third base) and leadoff hitter for the Orioles for the first half of 1955. He was traded along with Gene Woodling from the Orioles to the Cleveland Indians for Dave Pope, Wally Westlake and cash before the trade deadline on June 15, 1955. He would not report to his new team. Even after a meeting with Indians' manager Al López, Cox resolved to retire and did so on June 17.`

In 1058 games over 11 seasons, Cox posted a .262 batting average (974-for-3712) with 470 runs, 174 doubles, 32 triples, 66 home runs, 351 RBI, 42 stolen bases, .318 on-base percentage and .380 slugging percentage. He finished his career with a .962 fielding percentage playing primarily at third base and also at shortstop and second base. In 15 World Series games, he batted .302 (16-for-53) with 7 runs, 5 doubles, 1 home run, 6 RBI and 4 walks.

References

External links

1919 births
1978 deaths
Baseball players from Pennsylvania
Pittsburgh Pirates players
Brooklyn Dodgers players
Baltimore Orioles players
Major League Baseball third basemen
Major League Baseball shortstops
Major League Baseball second basemen
Harrisburg Senators players
Deaths from cancer in Pennsylvania
People from Newport, Pennsylvania